Day6 (Even of Day), also known as Even of Day is the first sub-unit of the band Day6 based in South Korea, consisting of Young K, Wonpil and Dowoon. Formed by JYP Entertainment, they debuted on August 31, 2020 with their first EP The Book of Us: Gluon.

History 
In May 2020, prior to the release of the Day6's album The Book of Us: The Demon, it was announced that the group would cancel promotions of the album and go on hiatus due to the mental health issues of some members, later revealed to be leader Sungjin and guitarist Jae. Even of Day was formed with the remaining active members: bassist Young K, keyboardist Wonpil, and drummer Dowoon. On August 6, following rumors of the sub-unit, the group's label JYP Entertainment confirmed the sub-unit's formation, with details of its debut to follow.

On August 11, JYP officially introduced Day6's first sub-unit project, Even of Day, five years since their debut. JYP released a teaser image announcing the unit on Day6's social media pages. The unit name "Even of Day" was given by Park Jin-young, JYPE's founder. "Even" means "night" in the old word, so "Even of Day" conveys the message that a bright day will finally comes after a dark night. Fans gave them the nickname "KangWonDo" - "Kang" from the first syllable of Young K's surname, and Won and Do are from the first syllables of Wonpil and Dowoon's given names, with the surname sounding similar to Gangwon province. On August 13, they dropped the teaser schedule for their debut with the EP The Book of Us: Gluon, which marked the fourth installment of Day6's The Book of Us series. The Book of Us: Gluon, alongside its lead single "Where the Sea Sleeps," was released on August 31. The album debuted at number three in the Gaon Album Chart.

Even of Day partook in the first segment of the web music show Secret Atelier where they released a single, "So, This Is Love," on January 15, 2021, as a result of the show. On January 24, Even of Day held their first online concert, Online Party Night: The Arcane Salon. On July 5, the group made their first comeback with their second EP Right Through Me and its title track of the same name. Even of Day held their second concert, Day6 Even of Day: Right Through Me, through the online concert platform Beyond Live on August 8. On August 31, 2022, the unit released a special music video for "Darling on the Beach".

Members 
 Young K – main vocals, rap, bass, guitar
 Wonpil – main vocals, keyboard, synthesizer
 Dowoon – sub vocals, drum

Discography

Extended plays

Singles

Tours and concerts

Online concerts 
 Online Party Night: The Arcane Salon (2020) 
 Day6 (Even of Day): Right Through Me (2021)

Filmography

Music videos

Variety shows

References 

JYP Entertainment artists
K-pop music groups
Musical groups established in 2020
Musical groups from Seoul
South Korean boy bands
South Korean rock music groups
South Korean pop rock music groups
South Korean alternative rock groups
2020 establishments in South Korea